Amblytelus fallax is a species of Psydrinae in the genus Amblytelus. It was described by Baehr in 2006.

References

Amblytelus
Beetles described in 2006